Kishimoto (written: 岸本) is a Japanese family name. Notable people with this family name include:
Cecil Kishimoto (born 1990), Japanese model
Christina Kishimoto, American school administrator
Hayami Kishimoto (born 1987), Japanese singer
Junki Kishimoto (born 1996), Japanese baseball player
Kayoko Kishimoto (born 1960), Japanese actress
Kazumi Kishimoto (born 1986), Japanese competitive figure skater
Masao Kishimoto (1881–1963), Director of the Karafuto Agency
Masashi Kishimoto (born 1974), Japanese manga artist and creator of Naruto. Also the older twin brother of Seishi Kishimoto
, Japanese long jumper
Saizo Kishimoto (1928–2014), Japanese gangster
Seishi Kishimoto (born 1974), Japanese manga artist and creator of 666 Satan. Also the younger twin brother of Masashi Kishimoto
Tadamitsu Kishimoto (born 1939), Japanese immunologist
Takayuki Kishimoto (born 1990), Japanese hurdler
, Japanese chef
, Japanese screenwriter
Toshiko D'Elia (née Kishimoto) (1930–2014), American Masters athletics long distance runner
Yoshihisa Kishimoto (born 1961), Japanese video game designer and creator of the Kunio-kun and Double Dragon franchises

Fictional characters
Kaoru Kishimoto, a character in Hikaru no Go media
Kei Kishimoto, a character in Gantz media

Japanese-language surnames